Les Intrigantes, is a French crime drama film from 1954, directed by Henri Decoin, written by François Boyer, starring Raymond Rouleau and Louis de Funès.

Paul Rémi, a well-known theater director, accused by Andrieux, his secretary. Advised by Mona, hiding in psychiatric hospital.

Cast

References

External links 
 
 Les Intrigantes (1954) at the Films de France

1954 films
French crime drama films
1954 crime drama films
1950s French-language films
French black-and-white films
Films directed by Henri Decoin
1950s French films